Berlin Bear may refer to:

The coat of arms of Berlin (Berliner Bär)
Sculptures created by Renée Sintenis, used as the basis for the
Golden Bear award at the Berlinale
United Buddy Bears